Daily Banglar Bani was a Bangladeshi national newspaper published in Bengali language. Banglar Bani had a secular ideology and was pro Bangladesh Awami League. It has closed down.

History
The Daily Banglar Bani started publication in 1969 by Hafiz Hafizur Rahman and Sheikh Fazlul Haque Mani. During the Bangladesh Liberation war in 1971 the Daily Banglar Bani was published from Kolkata. The Newspaper was founded by Sheikh Fazlul Haque Mani, a politician of Bangladesh Awami League and the nephew of President Sheikh Mujibur Rahman. After the Independence of Bangladesh, Banglar Bani started publication in Dhaka from 21 February 1972. The paper received the highest amount of government advertisement when the Bangladesh Awami League government was in power. Sheikh Moni was a rival of Tajuddin Ahmed and would write editorials against him in the paper. The newspaper was banned in February 1987 by the government of General Hussain Mohammad Ershad for accusing the government of supplying weapons to militias. In the 1990s Islamic fundamentalist called for the newspaper to be closed.

References

Bengali-language newspapers published in Bangladesh
Daily newspapers published in Bangladesh
Publications established in 1969
1969 establishments in East Pakistan
Newspapers published in Dhaka
Defunct newspapers published in Bangladesh